Tiiu Levald (born 15 March 1940 in Tallinn) is an Estonian opera singer (soprano), pedagogue and music critic.

In 1970 she graduated from Tallinn State Conservatory. From 1964 until 1973, she sang with the Estonia Theatre's opera choir. She has also been a chamber singer.

From 1973 until 2013, she was a pedagogue at Estonian Music and Theatre Academy. Students include: Sirje Puura, Annika Tõnuri, Vivian Kallaste, Moonika Sutt, Karmen Puis, Eha Pärg, Vilve Hepner, Merle Hillep.

Opera roles

 2nd boy (Mozart's "Võluflööt", 1964)
 Tuul (Raudmäe's "Kiri nõudmiseni", 1965)
 Krahvinna Ceprano (Verdi's "Rigoletto", 1968)

Discography 
1986  Consortium  Vinyl 7"     Мелодия / С12 23409 006

References

Living people
1940 births
Estonian critics
Estonian women critics
Estonian operatic sopranos
20th-century Estonian women opera singers
Estonian Academy of Music and Theatre alumni
Academic staff of the Estonian Academy of Music and Theatre
Singers from Tallinn